Psychopathia Sexualis: eine Klinisch-Forensische Studie (Sexual Psychopathy: A Clinical-Forensic Study, also known as Psychopathia Sexualis, with Especial Reference to the Antipathetic Sexual Instinct: A Medico-forensic Study) is an 1886 book by Richard Freiherr von Krafft-Ebing and one of the first texts about sexual pathology. The book details a wide range of paraphilias and focuses on male homosexuality/bisexuality (the "antipathetic instinct" of the subtitle). The book coined the terms "sadism and masochism" as well as borrowing the term bisexual from botanical language.

Masochism, which Krafft-Ebing focuses on at length, is for example defined as a particular erotic sensibility, in which the individual is, "in his sexual feelings and thoughts, dominated by the idea of being absolutely and unconditionally subjected to a person of the other sex".

The Psychopathia Sexualis is notable for being one of the earliest works on homosexuality. Krafft-Ebing combined Karl Heinrich Ulrichs' Urning theory with Bénédict Morel's theory of social degeneration and proposed the theory that most homosexuals have a mental illness caused by degenerate heredity. The book was controversial at the time, arousing the anger of the church in particular .

The book had a considerable influence on continental European forensic psychiatry in the first part of the 20th century. It is regarded as an important text in the history of psychopathology.

In 2006, an independent film based on the book was made in Atlanta; the film was titled Psychopathia Sexualis.

Editions
the first edition was published in 1886
at least 12 editions of the book were published in German prior to Richard's death in 1902
in 1965, an English translation derived from the 12th German edition was written by Franklin S. Kaf, with an introduction by Kaf and a foreword by Joseph LoPiccolo

References

External links

 
 

1886 non-fiction books
Non-fiction books adapted into films
German non-fiction books
Psychology books
Sexual orientation and science